Gursulu is a village in the municipality of Yenilik in the Agsu Rayon of Azerbaijan.

References

Populated places in Agsu District